Collette Pope Heldner, born Dorothy Colette Pope (May 18, 1902 in Waupaca, Wisconsin - May 3, 1990 in New Orleans, Louisiana) was an American painter. She married Knute Heldner, who was her instructor at a school in Minnesota. The two lived and painted in New Orleans from 1923 onward.

References

 Ask Art
 Ask Art
 Artfact.com

1902 births
1990 deaths
20th-century American painters
Painters from Minnesota